The YM2414, a.k.a. OPZ, is an eight-channel sound chip developed by Yamaha. It was used in many mid-market phase/frequency modulation-based synthesizers, including Yamaha's TX81Z (the first product to feature the chip and was named after it), DX11, YS200 family, the Korg Z3 guitar synthesizer, and many other devices. A successor was released as the upgraded OPZII/YM2424, used only in the Yamaha V50.

The OPZ has the following features:
Eight concurrent FM synthesis channels
Four operators per channel
Eight selectable waveforms
Fixed-frequency mode, which can go much lower in the OPZII, enabling 0 Hz carriers or low rates for native chorusing
Dual sine-wave low frequency oscillators

Products
The chip was used in the PortaTone PSR-80 and PSR-6300, the Yamaha TX81Z rack-mounted FM synthesizer, the Yamaha DX11, DSR1000 and 2000, YS100, YS200 and DS55 synthesizers, the TQ5 Tone Generator and the Yamaha EMT-1 half-rack FM Sound Expander module.

See also
 List of Yamaha products

References

External links
Korg Z3 at joness.com
DX11 at vintagesynth.com

YM2414